The Buick Reatta is a low-volume transverse front-engine, front-wheel drive, two-door, two-seater grand tourer manufactured and marketed by Buick as a coupe (1988–1991) and convertible (1990-1991) — both featuring a 3.8 liter V6 engine and shortened version of the GM E platform, shared with the seventh generation Buick Riviera.

As Buick's first two-seater and its first convertible since the 1985 Riviera, the Reatta was manufactured in a highly specialized assembly program at the Reatta Craft Center (later known as the Lansing Craft Center) in Lansing, Michigan—achieving production of over 21,000 units in four years.

Overview

For the Reatta's manufacture at the Reatta Craft Center, specialized teams of workers assembled the car at a series of stations rather than on a conventional assembly line.  After a team had completed their portion of the assembly, the car would be moved by robots to the next station.  Paintwork was performed on site under subcontract to PPG Industries.

The Reatta used GM's transverse "Buick 3800" V6 with 165–170 hp (123–127 kW) and 210–220 lb·ft (285–298 N·m) of torque with the highest output in the last year of production. The car used a fully independent suspension, 4 wheel disc brakes with ABS, and front wheel drive. Top speed was electronically limited to 125 mph (201 km/h). The Reatta was rated at 18 mpg (13.1 L/100 km) in the city and 27 mpg (8.7 L/100 km) on the highway.

Intended as a halo car for Buick, production was projected at 20,000 Reattas annually, and was available while the Cadillac Allanté and Pontiac Fiero were also available.  GM announced the end of production in early 1991.

Features

The Reatta featured twin bucket seats with a storage area behind the seats featuring two lockable bins and a lockable access hatch to the rear trunk.  At introduction, options included 16-way power seats in lieu of 6-way power seats, side moldings in either black or body color and pinstripe delete.  A sunroof became optional in late 1988, and in 1989 keyless entry was added as a standard feature. The 1988 listed retail price was $25,000 ($ in  dollars ).

The Reatta had the distinction of being Buick's only car with pop-up headlamps with the entire headlamp assembly moving up and down. The other Buick cars with hidden headlamps, the Riviera (1965–1969) and the Skyhawk (1987–1989 for certain trim levels), had fixed headlamps hidden behind moveable covers.

Initially (1988–89), the Reatta featured a touchscreen computer interface, marketed as the Electronic Control Center (ECC), that included radio and climate control functions, date reminder, trip computer and user-configurable overspeed alarm, as well as diagnostic access to the vehicle's electronic systems and sensors.  Later models were equipped with conventional push-button stereo and climate controls.  The new system eliminated the trip computer functionality and the climate control buttons could access diagnostic information, replacing the diagnostic scanner capability formerly provided by the touchscreen.

In 1990, the interior was redesigned, adding a driver's airbag and an optional CD player.  In 1991, the "L27" 3800 engine and 4T60-E transmission replaced the "LN3" and hydraulic 4T60 units and the Reatta received a new ABS system, new 16" wheels, automatic headlamps and a cup holder built into the armrest.

Each Reatta included a leather book containing the owner's manual and a pen. In 1990 and 1991, a zippered owner's folio was included holding the owner's manual, pen, flashlight and tire gauge, as well as a "Craftsman's Log" with the signatures of the supervisors for the car's assembly.

In 1988, approximately fifty-five examples were designated "Select Sixties" and allocated to Buick's top sixty dealers. The models, internally designated model X22, featured a black exterior, tan interior, and unique "Select Sixty" hood emblems.

In 1990, the Select Sixty program was repeated, with sixty-five white convertibles including special emblems, and a flame red interior with white bucket seats, white 16-inch wheels, and cup holder.

Convertible
After a delayed introduction due to design difficulties, Buick introduced the convertible Reatta in 1990 with a manually-operated top designed by ASC, available in vinyl or cloth with a glass rear window and electric defroster.  When retracted, the top was protected by a rigid tonneau cover.  The 1991 models featured power pull-down motors to assist in tightening the rear bow of the top to the tonneau cover.

A Buick convertible would not be offered again until the four-seat Buick Cascada debuted in 2016.

Production

The first pilot car was finished at the Reatta Craft Centre in December 1986. Series production began in January 1988 and ended on May 10, 1991. The original car was sometimes referred to as a "1988½ model year", owing to its January introduction.

References

1991 Buick Reatta sales brochure

External links

ReattaDriver.com Buick Reatta Club Enthusiast website
Reattas.com The Reatta Farm website

Reatta
Grand tourers
Convertibles
Coupés
Vehicles built in Lansing, Michigan
Cars introduced in 1988
1990s cars
Motor vehicles manufactured in the United States
Front-wheel-drive sports cars
Cars discontinued in 1991